The 2003 British Formula Three season was the 53rd British Formula Three Championship season. It commenced on 6 April, and ended on 28 September after twenty-four races.

Drivers and teams
The following teams and drivers were competitors in the 2003 British Formula Three Championship. The Scholarship class is for older Formula Three cars. Teams in the Invitation class are not series regulars, and do not compete for championship points.

Results

 * Round 19 stopped after 5 of 11 laps, half points awarded.

Standings

References

http://forix.autosport.com/cp.php?l=0&d=46&r=462003&c=0

External links
 The official website of the British Formula 3 Championship

British Formula Three Championship seasons
Formula Three season
British
British Formula 3 Championship